Berberis verruculosa, the warty barberry or warted barberry, is an evergreen shrub, ranging in size from 1–2 m, native to western China (Gansu, Sichuan, Yunnan). It gets its common name from its "warty" stems, that have rounded, more or less identical, raised spots.

Berberis verruculosa is a shrub up to 100 cm tall, with yellow spines along the twigs. Leaves are 1.5–2 cm long, hard, leathery, glossy dark green above, vivid white below with stomatal wax; in cold winter weather, the leaves may turn purplish-green above on exposed shoots. The flowers are small, yellow, and mature into dark purple berries 6–10 mm long.

Cultivation
Berberis verruculosa is cultivated in temperate climates as an ornamental plant, and grows well in any garden soil. It thrives in shade or partial shade. The plant has been awarded the Royal Horticultural Society's Award of Garden Merit.

References

verruculosa
Flora of China
Plants described in 1906